The feline owlet-nightjar (Aegotheles insignis) is a species of bird in the family Aegothelidae. It is found in New Guinea. Its natural habitat is subtropical or tropical moist montane forests.

References

External links
 image and classification at Animal Diversity Web

feline owlet-nightjar
Birds of prey of New Guinea
feline owlet-nightjar
Taxonomy articles created by Polbot